The women's long jump at the 2016 IAAF World Indoor Championships took place on March 18, 2016.

On paper, Brittney Reese came into this meet with a 20 cm better personal best.  But the personal best came before a 2014 injury.  Her 2015 season was still hampered by recovery.  Ivana Španović wasn't reading the paper and took the first round lead with a new indoor personal best 7.00, just short of her outdoor personal best of 7.02.  Reese jumped 6.97 to assume second place but couldn't match that until her fifth round jump when she equalled it exactly.  For a little over a minute, Reese held the lead based on the tie breaking second best jump.  Španović broke that up by jumping a new personal best and National Record of 7.07.  With her one remaining jump, Reese pulled out the big gun, letting out a scream as she boomed her  winner, just 1 cm below her indoor personal best, set to win this championship 4 years earlier, also on her last jump.

Behind the battle for gold, Lorraine Ugen was in third place after the first round with a 6.62.  Janay DeLoach Soukup moved into bronze medal position with her second round 6.80 which also held up until the fifth round fireworks where Ugen flew out to a 6.93 National Record.  DeLoach improved on her next two jumps, but her best of 6.89 couldn't quite make up the gap.

Results
The final was started at 18.55.

References

Long jump
Long jump at the World Athletics Indoor Championships
2016 in women's athletics